Kostal Cone, also called Kostal Volcano and Fire Mountain, is a young cinder cone in Wells Gray Provincial Park in east-central British Columbia, Canada. It rises from the northeast shore of Kostal Lake in the Cariboo Mountains.

There has been activity at this site as recently as 7,600 years ago, though more likely less than 1,000 years ago. Kostal Cone is too young for the commonly used potassium-argon dating technique (usable on specimens over 100,000 years old), and no charred organic material for radiocarbon dating has been found. However, the uneroded structure of the cone with the existence of trees on its flanks and summit have it an area for dendrochronology studies, which reveals the growth of tree-ring patterns. Tree-growth data has revealed an age of 400 years for Kostal Cone, making it the youngest volcano in the Wells Gray-Clearwater volcanic field and one of the youngest volcanoes in Canada.

Kostal Cone is made of fragmented and solidified lava called cinder and its summit contains a bowl-shaped crater. Kostal's cinders were ejected by lava fountain eruptions and accumulated around the volcano's vent in the shape of a cone when they fell back around its surroundings. Lava flows from Kostal's 400 BP eruption are basaltic in composition and forms a lava bed. It is an example of volcanic activity that has occurred in the Wells Gray-Clearwater volcanic field since the last glacial period; others include the Dragon's Tongue lava flow from Dragon Cone just north of Kostal Cone and the Flourmill Volcanoes north of Mahood Lake.

See also
 Volcanism of Western Canada
 List of volcanoes in Canada

References

 
 
 

Cinder cones of British Columbia
Wells Gray-Clearwater
Holocene volcanoes
Polygenetic cinder cones
One-thousanders of British Columbia
Kamloops Division Yale Land District